The Northwest Angle State Forest is a state forest located in Lake of the Woods County, Minnesota. The name of the forest is derived from its location near the Northwest Angle, the northernmost point of the contiguous United States. The forest borders the Canadian provinces of Manitoba and Ontario, and the Red Lake Indian Reservation. The forest is managed by the Minnesota Department of Natural Resources.

Tree species of the forest are Tamarack, Black Spruce, Eastern White Pine, Red Pine, Northern Whitecedar, and Paper Birch. Popular outdoor recreational activities are hunting, fishing and boating on Lake of the Woods, birdwatching, and dispersed camping. Trails are designated for hiking; all motorized recreation is prohibited, with the exception of snowmobiling in the wintertime.

See also
List of Minnesota state forests
Northwest Angle
Lake of the Woods
Garden Island State Recreation Area
Fort Saint Charles
Angle Inlet, Minnesota
Penasse, Minnesota
Red Lake Indian Reservation

References

External links
Northwest Angle State Forest - Minnesota Department of Natural Resources (DNR)

Minnesota state forests
Protected areas of Lake of the Woods County, Minnesota
Protected areas established in 1935
1935 establishments in Minnesota